Maurice Joseph Fenn (5 May 1911 – 11 April 1995) was a Fijian cricketer. Fenn was a leg break googly bowler.

Fenn made his first-class debut for Fiji in 1948 against Auckland during Fiji's 1947–48 tour of New Zealand, where he played five first-class matches in total. Fenn played a further four first-class matches during Fiji's 1953–54 tour of New Zealand, with his final first-class match for Fiji coming against Auckland.

In his 9 first-class matches for Fiji he scored 296 runs at a batting average of 19.73, with a high score of 44. Widely regarded as the best bowler Fiji has produced, Fenn took 50 wickets at a bowling average of 20.90. He took four five wicket hauls and took ten wickets in a match once, with best innings bowling figures of 6/94 against Auckland in 1948.

Fenn also represented Fiji in 25 non first-class matches from 1948 to 1960, with his final match for Fiji coming against Newcastle during their 1959–60 tour of Australia.

Fenn died on 11 April 1995 in Samoa.

External links
Maurice Fenn at Cricinfo
Maurice Fenn at CricketArchive

1911 births
1995 deaths
People from Lau Province
Fijian cricketers